The Austin 400 was a motor racing event for V8 Supercars that took place at the Circuit of the Americas in Travis County near Austin, Texas, United States of America in 2013.

History
Its inaugural running took place between 17 and 19 May 2013, as the fifth round of the 2013 International V8 Supercars Championship.

Demise
The race was not held in 2014 due to the track hosting the X Games; regarding the scheduling conflict, V8 Supercar chief executive James Warburton stated, "The timing of COTA securing the X Games next year led to the mutual agreement of a gap-year before consolidating, planning and returning to Texas in 2015."

On 28 August 2014, it was announced that V8 Supercars and the Circuit of the Americas had agreed to terminate the current contract. It is unlikely that V8 Supercars will return to the US for the foreseeable future.

Winners

See also
 List of Australian Touring Car Championship races

References

2013 establishments in Texas
Auto races in the United States
Motorsport competitions in Texas
Recurring sporting events established in 2013
Circuit of the Americas
Supercars Championship races